Craviotto Drums is a drum kit manufacturing company, based in Nashville, Tennessee.

History 

Craviotto Drums founder and CEO, John “Johnny C” Craviotto was born to Italian-American parents (mother from Florence, father from Genoa) in San Francisco, CA.  Johnny began playing drums at an early age and he started playing professionally as a teenager. In the 1970s, a young Johnny Craviotto started off his musical career as a professional drummer playing with artists such as Arlo Guthrie, Ry Cooder, Moby Grape, Neil Young, and Buffy St. Marie.  At this time, he had also become a collector of vintage drums and developed an interest in the work of early drum builders.

 
Craviotto had the opportunity around 1979-80 to work in a boatyard with a master boat builder. As an apprentice and helper he began applying this technique to drum shells.  So with the help of the master boat builder, Johnny began making one-ply drum shells.  By 1984-85, Craviotto teamed up with Billy Gibson, drummer of Huey Lewis & The News.  They launched a drum company, Select Drum Company (later changed to “Solid”) Drum Company.

Craviotto developed a steam-bending technique which led to a partnership with Don Lombardi of DW Drums in 1993. For about a decade beginning in the 1990s, Craviotto’s snare drums were available as part of Drum Workshop's catalogs.

Around 1999, Craviotto started a new venture, which was to build drums from ancient, old growth wood recovered from sunken timber. He launched a limited-edition series of solid-ply drums made from 600-year-old wood rescued from the bottom of Lake Superior. These drums were adorned with hoops engraved by engraver, John Aldridge – the “Lake Superior Timeless Timber series.”  Several years later, these were followed up with the Lake Superior Timeless Timber birch series of drums. followed by The Lake Superior snare drum (1999). The logs were found by divers, who were searching for a treasure, and they were blocked by these logs. 

John Angelo Craviotto died on July 15, 2016 of cardiac arrest.

In 2019, the company relocated to Nashville, Tennessee. The company hired Sam Bacco as the new Executive Vice President. With a history of being involved with other drum companies, Sam Bacco brought his expertise in quality drum manufacturing to Craviotto and enabled the company's aspirations to continue Johnny's legacy.

In 2021, Craviotto announced the company's first subsidiary brand of ply-wood shells, Diamond Drums. This particular product was the result of Sam Bacco's involvement in the company. Also in 2021, Craviotto trademarked the phrase "Ply Shells Perfected™". These drums feature Craviotto's Maple-Ply Shells, Gold Tone Interior Sealer, Straight-Shot Edges, Marquise Lugs, and Stick-Saver Hoops. In Q2 of 2022, David Victor (Craviotto VP of Marketing, Sales, Production, Web Design, Product Design, and Customer Service) confirmed through a Craviotto Owner Facebook group that Bacco had decided to leave the company. It was later announced that the company's focus would be shifted back to Solid Shell Drums and the Diamond Drums brand would be discontinued in 2022.

Drumset Lineup

Drum Kits 

Custom Shop drum sets: feature the signature, one ply shells. Custom Shop drums are available in a variety of wood species including Maple, Ash, Cherry, Poplar, Walnut or Mahogany. Custom Shop drums can be constructed of a solitary wood species, or wood species can be mixed & matched throughout the depth of the drum to create Craviotto's exclusive Stacked Solid shells. Craviotto offers three different bearing edges: 45°, 30°, or Baseball Bat (BB). Edges can be mixed and matched between the various drums’ batter & resonant sides to achieve different tonal characteristics.

These drums include a choice of either Craviotto's traditional machined brass, chrome-plated Diamond Tube Lug, or the Marquise cast lug.  Finish options include natural oiled finishes, or lacquers available in a variety of solid or sparkle colors. Inlays are available in either maple, cherry or walnut. Custom Shop kits are outfitted with 2.3mm triple flange hoops standard, however wood hoops are available as well.

They are available in any configuration of sizes from 10” through 26”. Cocktail configurations are also available. 
 Center Stage kits: Constructed of the same signature solid shells as the Custom Shop kits, however are limited to Maple shells, with 45° edges, Walnut inlay, and limited sizes. Center Stage kits feature a single, center mounted cast lug.  Preconfigured kits are available in the following configurations: 7x12, 12x14, 12x18, 7x12, 12x14, 12x20, 8x13, 14x16, 12x22, 8x13, 14x16, 12x24.
 Center Stage drums are also available à la carte in the following sizes: 7x12, 8x13, 12x14, 13x15, 14x16, 12x18, 12x20, 12x22, 12x24.

Snare Drums 
 Custom Shop snares feature the handmade, in house one ply shells available in Maple, Ash, Cherry, Poplar, Walnut or Mahogany. Drummers are welcome to choose diameters between 10” and 20”, and any depth of their choosing (minimum 3.5”). Custom Shop feature Craviotto's machined brass, chrome-plated Diamond Tube Lug. Any combination of 45°, 30°, or Baseball Bat (BB) edges are available. Unless otherwise requested by the customer, Custom Shop snare drums come outfitted with a Trick GS007 throwoff, 2.3mm triple flange hoops, Remo Ambassador drumheads, and Craviotto's signature Diamond butt plate unless any specifics are specified by the customer otherwise.

 Private Reserve are Custom Shop snare drums that are made of particularly uniquely figured pieces of wood, or particularly rare species. Private Reserve drums are designed by Johnny Craviotto, and are marked with a red Private Reserve badge.
 Johnny C. Series feature a Craviotto handmade solid Maple shell with 45° edges. Johnny C. Series snare drums feature a cast lug, Trick GS007 throwoff, 2.3mm triple flange hoops, Remo Ambassador drumheads, and Craviotto's signature Diamond butt plate. Johnny C. Series snare drums are available as a 5.5x13”, 6.5x13”, 5.5x14” or 6.5x14”.
The Super Swing features a 7x14” solid Maple shell with Walnut inlay and 45° edges. It features 8 cast lugs, and walnut stained wood hoops with die cast claws.

Collaborations with AK Drums Italy 
In 2007, Craviotto Drum Company teamed up with Adrian Kirchler (AK Drums Italy) to introduce a series of limited edition, handmade metal snare drums. Models released were:
 2008: Diamond Series Nickel over Brass, featuring a fully engraved, nickel-plated brass shell. (50x) 5.5x14” and (50x) 6.5x14” were produced.
 2009: Copper Diamond Series, featured a raw copper shell. (50x) 5.5x14” and (50x) 6.5x14” were produced.
 2012: Masters Metal Brass/Copper, featured a hybrid shell with raw brass on the batter side and raw bopper on the resonant side. (50x) 5.5x14” and (50x) 6.5x14” were produced.
 2013: Masters Brass, featured a raw brass shell. (25x) 4.5x14”, (40x) 5.5x14”, (60x) 6.5x14” and (25x) 8x14” were produced.
 2014: Craviotto Black Diamond, created in celebration of the Craviotto Drum Company's 10th Anniversary. This drum featured a black nickel-plated, fully engraved brass shell. (25x) 5.5x14” were produced.
 2016: Craviotto Masters Bronze, featuring a raw bronze shell. (25x) 5.25x14” and (75x) 7x14” were produced.

Hardware 
 Marquise Lugs
 Johnny C. Lugs
 Diamond Tube Lugs
 Diamond Cast Lugs

Artists 

 Ronnie Vannucci - The Killers
 Jason McGerr - Death Cab for Cutie
 Chad Cromwell - Neil Young
 Bernie Dresel - The Brian Setzer Orchestra
 Chris McHugh - Keith Urban Garth Brooks (Nashville Session Drummer)
 Ben Wyscoki - The Fray
 Jerry Roe - Friendship Commanders (Nashville Session Drummer)
 Justin Faulkner - Branford Marsalis
 Chris Tyrrell - Lady Antebellum
 Scott Amendola - Charlie Hunter
 Keith Prior - David Gray
 Chris Knight - LeAnn Rimes
 Matt Wilson - Arts & Crafts Matt Wilson Quartet
 Steve Sinatra - Hunter Hayes
 Jerome Jennings - Christian McBride Trio
 Billy Martin - Medeski Martin & Wood
 Carmen Intorre - Pat Martino Trio
 Steve Lyman - Jose James, Chase Baird
 Andres Torres - La Santa Cecilia
 Justin Brown - Thundercat Amrose Akinmusire
 Les DeMerle - The Dynamic Les DeMerle Orchestra
 Shahar Haziza - (Israeli Session Artist)
 Zach Velmer - (Sound Tribe Sector 9)
 Jarrod Alexander - (Gerard Way, Los Angeles Session Artist)
 Gulli Briem Mezzoforte
 Janet Weiss Sleater Kinney
 Zach Velmer (Sound Tribe Sector 9)
 Kendrick Scott Terence Blanchard Quintet Kendrick Scott Oracle
 M J Paluch  (Chicago's finest/Thr33-O)
 Sebastian Lavooy [Bella Jazz]
 Kaya Shaffer Thee Idylls / Little Silver Hearts / Don't Tell Sara
 Andrew Dunaj [Naysayin]

References

External links

 

Percussion instrument manufacturing companies
Musical instrument manufacturing companies of the United States
Manufacturing companies based in Nashville, Tennessee